The 1876 Rutgers Queensmen football team represented Rutgers University in the 1876 college football season. The Queensmen played only one intercollegiate game, a 3–2 victory over Stevens on November 1. The team had no coach, and its captain was Andrew Raymond.

Schedule

References

Rutgers
Rutgers Scarlet Knights football seasons
College football undefeated seasons
Rutgers Queensmen football